The 1999 Team Ice Racing World Championship was the 21st edition of the Team World Championship. The final was held on ?, 1999, in Berlin, in Germany. Russia won the title.

Final Classification

See also 
 1999 Individual Ice Speedway World Championship
 1999 Speedway World Team Cup in classic speedway
 1999 Speedway Grand Prix in classic speedway

References 

Ice speedway competitions
World